Szigetvár is a town in Baranya County in southern Hungary.

History

The town's fortress was the setting of the Siege of Szigetvár in 1566. It was a sanjak centre at first in Budin Province (1566–1601), later in Kanije Province (1601–1689).

The former Andrássy Palace is next to them. Some other monuments in the town date back to Ottoman times. Two years after the siege, the mosque of Ali Pasha was built, later – in 1788 – to be transformed into a Christian church: the Roman Catholic parish church. The two minarets, as well as the windows and niches with ogee arches indicate its original function. The Turkish House of red raw brick walls and interlaced steel window grills in Bástya Street was originally destined to be a caravanserai. The two holy-water basins of the Franciscan Church were made of Turkish washbasins. The carved main altar of the Baroque Church is another sight to see. In 1966, on the 400th anniversary of the siege, Szigetvár regained its old rank of a chartered ancient city. Development began to gather speed. Today it has a population of 12,000. In October 2011, the city received the title Civitas Invicta from the Hungarian Parliament.

In 1994, the Hungarian-Turkish Friendship Park was established as a public park, dedicated in memorial to the Battle of Szigetvár.

Archaeological digs conducted by the University of Pécs starting in 2016 revealed the tomb of Sultan Suleiman the Magnificent in the nearby destroyed settlement of Turbék.

Twin towns – sister cities

Szigetvár is twinned with:

 Čakovec, Croatia
 Deva, Romania
 Eppingen, Germany
 Imatra, Finland
 Pag, Croatia
 Slatina, Croatia
 Trabzon, Turkey

Gallery

See also
Nikola IV Zrinski

References

External links

 in Hungarian
Szigetvár at funiq.hu 

Populated places in Baranya County
Baranya (region)
History of Baranya (region)